The John Montmollin Warehouse (also known as the John Montmollin Building) is a building in Savannah, Georgia, United States. It is located on Barnard Street in the northwestern civic block of Ellis Square, in Savannah's City Market. Built in 1855, it was built 35 years after the first building on the square, the Thomas Gibbons Range.

Owned by John S. Montmollin, between the mid-1850s and 1864 the building was used to trade African American slaves, even after president Abraham Lincoln signed the Emancipation Proclamation. They were held there until their fate became known. The building's third floor was owned by Alexander Bryan, who later took over the whole of the premises after Montmollin's death in June 1859. The building became slave-free after General Sherman's "March to the Sea" in November and December 1864.

See also
Buildings in Savannah Historic District

References

External links
Letter by John Montmollin, Savannah, Georgia, to Ziba Oakes, February 17, 1857 – American Ancestors

Commercial buildings completed in 1855
Ellis Square (Savannah) buildings
History of slavery in Georgia (U.S. state)
Savannah Historic District